East Zagori is a former municipality in the Ioannina regional unit, Epirus, Greece. Since the 2011 local government reform it is part of the municipality Zagori, of which it is a municipal unit. The municipal unit has an area of 269.657 km2. Population 1,469 (2011). The seat of the municipality was in Miliotades.

References

Populated places in Ioannina (regional unit)
Zagori